is a city located in Chiba Prefecture, Japan.

Geography
It is included in the urban employment area of Tokyo metropolis.

Surrounding municipalities
Chiba Prefecture
Tōgane
Yachimata
Tomisato
Kujūkuri
Shibayama
Yokoshibahikari

Climate
Sanmu has a humid subtropical climate (Köppen Cfa) characterized by warm summers and cool winters with light to no snowfall.  The average annual temperature in Sanmu is 14.8 °C. The average annual rainfall is 1550 mm with September as the wettest month. The temperatures are highest on average in August, at around 25.9 °C, and lowest in January, at around 4.8 °C.

Demographics
Per Japanese census data, the population of Sanmu peaked around the year 2000 and has declined since.

History
The area of Sanmu was part of ancient Kazusa Province. The city of Sanmu was established on March 27, 2006, from the merger of the towns of Sanbu, Matsuo and Narutō, and the village of Hasunuma (all from Sanbu District). The kanji for the city name are the same as for the former town of Sanbu, but is pronounced differently. Sanmu was damaged by a tsunami as a result of the 2011 Tōhoku earthquake and tsunami, with 43 buildings destroyed and 438 buildings partially destroyed, but with only one fatality.

Government
Sanmu has a mayor-council form of government with a directly elected mayor and a unicameral city council of 20 members. Sanmu contributes one member to the Chiba Prefectural Assembly. In terms of national politics, the city is part of Chiba 11th district of the lower house of the Diet of Japan.

Economy
Due to mixed plantings of Japanese red pine, Japanese cypress, and Japanese cedar, Sanmu was a center of wood production until 1923 at the end of the Taishō period. Many in the town remain active in the woodworking and carpentry trade. Small-scale agriculture in Sanmu produces a variety of fruits and vegetables, but the town is noted for carrots, watermelon, peanuts. The town also attracts tourists to its numerous strawberry farms. Sanmu serves as a bedroom community for nearby Chiba and Tokyo, and housing development continues in the city.

Education
Sanmu has 13 public elementary schools and six public middle schools operated by the city government, and two public high schools operated by the Chiba Prefectural Board of Education

Transportation

Railway
 JR East – Sōbu Main Line
 -  - 
 JR East – Tōgane Line

Highway

Noted people from Sanmu
Itō Sachio, Writer
Kumiko Asō, actress
Aoi Yuki, actress

Gallery

References

External links

Official Website 

 
Cities in Chiba Prefecture
Populated coastal places in Japan